Andrew Fitzgarfield Kennedy (born December 22, 1965) is a retired American-Jamaican basketball player, most notable for his years playing in the Israeli league, with Hapoel Galil Elyon's successful teams of the early 1990s. He was the 1996 Israeli Basketball Premier League MVP.

Biography
Kennedy attended Calabar High School in Kingston, Jamaica in 1978-83, and participated in a number of sports including table tennis, athletics, and basketball. He was an above-average student, and regularly won awards for excellence and school citizenship. He was drawn to basketball, where he played on the B and later A team. Of note was the rivalry between Kennedy and his older brother Michael Kennedy, who played basketball for Kingston College, Calabar's archrival. The two met on numerous occasions.

A 6' 7" forward, Kennedy studied at the University of Virginia and after graduating he was picked in the 1987 NBA Draft by the Dallas Mavericks as the 43rd pick overall.

He arrived to the Upper Galilee, Israel (Galil Elyon) in 1989 and played for the local team of Hapoel Galil Elyon for seven seasons in three teams, in his first four seasons winning a national cup in 1992 and an historic championship a year later in 1993. He was the 1996 Israeli Basketball Premier League MVP. To this day he holds the record for most seasons played in Israel by an import player, a total of 12, in six teams.

Kennedy later played in Italy, Spain, and France before his retirement in 2005.

References

External links
ACB.com Profile

1965 births
Living people
Amarillo Badgers men's basketball players
American expatriate basketball people in France
American expatriate basketball people in Israel
American expatriate basketball people in Italy
American expatriate basketball people in Spain
American men's basketball players
Bnei Hertzeliya basketball players
CB Valladolid players
Hapoel Galil Elyon players
Ironi Ramat Gan players
Israeli Basketball Premier League players
Jamaican men's basketball players
Jamaican expatriate basketball people
Jamaican emigrants to the United States
Liga ACB players
Maccabi Haifa B.C. players
Philadelphia 76ers draft picks
Power forwards (basketball)
Rapid City Thrillers players
Small forwards
Sportspeople from Kingston, Jamaica
Virginia Cavaliers men's basketball players
People educated at Calabar High School
American expatriate basketball people in the Philippines
Alaska Aces (PBA) players
Philippine Basketball Association imports